The following is a list of number-one singles on the Billboard Japan Hot 100 chart in 2016.

Chart history

References

2016 in Japanese music
Japan Hot 100
Lists of number-one songs in Japan